Two Hands, One Mouth: Live in Europe is an album by American rock/pop group Sparks, released in March 2013. It is their first ever live album, and first double CD album.

In October 2012, Ron and Russell Mael embarked on the Two Hands, One Mouth Tour, which saw them performing for the first time ever as a duo, with no band. The tour started in Europe with a 18-city leg, and visited Lithuania, Latvia, Finland, Norway, Sweden, Germany, Belgium, the United Kingdom and Ireland. The final concert of the leg was at the sold-out Barbican Centre in London. The tour then took the group to Japan with concerts in Tokyo and Osaka in January 2013. In April 2013, the show was presented for the first time in the United States with two performances at the Coachella Festival, followed by a short leg of concerts in the rest of the country.

Two Hands, One Mouth: Live In Europe was released in March 2013. It contains concert recordings gathered from various cities during the European leg of the tour, in October 2012.

Track listing

Personnel

Composed by Ron Mael or by Ron Mael and Russell Mael.

Musicians
 Ron Mael – Keyboard
 Russell Mael – Vocals

References

External links
 Sparks Official Website

2013 live albums
Sparks (band) albums